Damian Mills (15 July 1979 – 17 November 2003) was a Canadian international cricketer. He was a right-handed opening batsman and right-arm medium bowler.

Early life 

Damian Mills was born on 15 July 1979, in Winnipeg, Manitoba, the son of Dr. Barry Mills and Rona Mills. He had two sisters, Cresida and Eleanor. His enthusiasm for cricket started in 1985 during a family visit to England, when he saw his first cricket match. Before the family returned from their vacation Damian's father presented him with a size-2 junior cricket bat. Dr. Mills strongly encouraged young Damian's interest in cricket.

Domestic cricket

Club 

Mills started to play organized cricket in 1986 at age seven at Lincoln Elementary School. In 1989 he joined the Manitoba Cricket Association Junior League. In 1992 he made his first appearance in the MCA Senior League. He was a member of the Winnipeg Juniors Cricket Club(WJCC) but played only two league games that year. During 1993 he became a regular member of the WJCC, mainly as a bowler. Due to injuries he gave up bowling and concentrated on his batting, which made his mark in cricket.

Representative 

In 1992, days before his 13th birthday, Damian became a member of The Manitoba Junior Provincial Team and for the first time tried out for The Canadian National Youth Team in Toronto. Damian was amongst the youngest athletes at the trials and whilst he did not make the team, he gained experience. On the first day of the tournament during the morning practice session he was hit very hard in the head by a ball, and spent the rest of the day in the emergency room of a Toronto hospital. The next day he played very hard throughout the tournament, despite his injury.

In 1994, Mills was invited by the Manitoba Cricket Association (MCA) to the MCA Senior Training Camp. The camp took place during the winter months.

In 1995, Mills first represented Manitoba on the Senior Provincial Team in the Western Provincial Championship, when he opened the batting against British Columbia and scored 42 runs. Returning from this competition at age 16 he scored his first century in the MCA Senior League: 111 runs not out. Since that time, Damian was an integral member of the Manitoba Senior Provincial Team.

International cricket 

Mills represented Canada for the first time in 1997 in the final International Youth Tournament in Bermuda. He again represented Canada in 1998 at The NorTel West Indies Youth Tournament in Trinidad and Tobago.

In 1999, Mills was selected for two Canadian teams: Canada Under-23; and the Canadian National Senior Team. He played for Canada in the West Indies Cricket Board’s Red Stripe Bowl competition in Antigua from October 1999 and again in 2000.

Also in 2000, Damian was selected by Ilford Cricket Club from England for a tour to India. He spent one winter playing in New Zealand.

Off-field activity

Cricket 

Mills was dedicated to the promotion of the sport and the development of youth cricketers. He was a coach at junior camps, schools, community centers and tournaments. He also made time to be an administrator of the sport. He was committed to an increasingly strong cricket program in Manitoba.

Study 

Mills started studies toward a Degree in Business Studies in 1997. Due to competing demands from cricket, he was expected to have graduated in April 2005 from the University of Manitoba.

Religion 

Mills was a church altar server from 8 to 21 years of age. During this time he helped to train young servers.

Death 

Mills died unexpectedly in his sleep on Monday 17 November 2003, at the age of 24. He had not been ill and there was no undetected medical condition.

Legacy 

The Damian Mills Junior Cricket Foundation was established in Mills' honor. The fund's purpose is to continue Damian's work in promoting the sport of cricket and to serve as a source of encouragement and inspiration to young cricketers.

Career highlights

Teams 

 Canada
 Canada U-23
 Canada U-19
 Manitoba, Manitoba U-25
 The Winnipeg Juniors Cricket Club
 Lincoln Elementary School

Major Tours 

 1995: Western Canada Provincial Tournament, Vancouver
 1997: International Youth Tournament, Bermuda
 1998: Nortel West Indies Youth Tournament, Trinidad and Tobago
 1999: Canada U-23 vs Bermuda, Toronto
 1999: WICB Red Stripe Bowl, Antigua
 1999: Four month training tour in New Zealand
 2000: WICB Red Stripe Bowl, Jamaica
 2000: Ilford Cricket Club (England) tour of India
 1996–2003: Western Canada Under-25 Provincial Championship, Edmonton

Accomplishments 

 In 1997, Mills scored the most runs in the Manitoba Senior League, repeating this performance five more times; in 1998, 1999, 2001, 2002 and in his final season, 2003.
 He was rated Best Batsman of the MCA League: 1999, 2001, 2003
 He scored the most runs in the MCA League: 1997, 1998, 1999, 2001, 2002, 2003
 He was the Most Outstanding Canadian Junior Cricketer of 1998, and the Outstanding Manitoba Junior Cricketer: 1996, 1997
 Mills also won many batting awards at the Western Canada Provincial U-25 Championships, MCA Indoor League and shares a Canadian Junior Record for highest opening partnership of 143 runs from the 1997 IYT in Bermuda.

External links 
 Manitoba Cricket Association bio
 CricInfoCanada bio
 Damian Mills Junior Cricket Award
 Inaugural Memorial Match
 2nd Annual Damian Mills Memorial Match

Canadian cricketers
1979 births
2003 deaths
Sportspeople from Winnipeg
Cricketers from Manitoba
University of Manitoba alumni